In molecular biology, the Nrf2 internal ribosome entry site (IRES) is an RNA element present in the 5′ UTR of the mRNA encoding the transcription factor Nrf2. It contains a stem-loop structure upstream of a ribosome binding site. This stem loop inhibits ribosome binding and translation of Nrf2 under normal conditions, but allows translation under oxidative stress conditions.

See also
Nrf2
Internal ribosome entry site
Ure2 internal ribosome entry site (IRES)

References

RNA
Non-coding RNA